Yasmin Nair is a writer and activist based in Chicago. She is also a co-founder, with Ryan Conrad, of Against Equality.

Biography
Nair was born in Kolkata in 1966  and lived there and later in Kathmandu and Mumbai before moving to the U.S. in 1989 to pursue graduate studies. She obtained a PhD in English from Purdue University in 2000.

Her work focuses on neoliberalism and inequality, sex, gender, and queer issues and politics, the politics of rescue and affect, the immigration crisis, sex trafficking, the art world,  and state violence. It has been published in publications such as In These Times, Monthly Review, The Awl, The Chicago Reader, GLQ, The Progressive, make/shift, Time Out Chicago, The Bilerico Project, Windy City Times, Bitch, Maximum Rock'n'Roll, and No More Potlucks and most of her work is also archived on her personal website. She's been working on her first book, Strange Love: Neoliberalism, Affect, and the Invention of Social Justice, since 2015.

In March 2013, Nico Lang wrote, "If you've heard of Yasmin Nair, you have an opinion about her. Her work doesn't evoke lukewarm reactions in people. Depending on who you ask, she's a leader, an icon, a teacher, a radical, a contrarian, a troll or all of the above." Some of her pieces are archived on her personal website, including "Gay Marriage IS A Conservative Cause", "'Undocumented': How an Identity Ended a Movement", and "Scabs: Academics and Others Who Write for Free".

Works

Books 
 Strange Love: Neoliberalism, Affect, and the Invention of Social Justice (forthcoming)

References

External links
 

Living people
Year of birth missing (living people)
Purdue University alumni
Writers from Kolkata
Indian human rights activists
Indian women non-fiction writers
Indian LGBT rights activists